Charland may refer to:

Persons 
Jacques Charland (born 1930), Canadian ski jumper
Rene Charland (1928–2013), American racing driver

Toponyms 
Charland River, a tributary of the St. Lawrence River, flowing in Saint-Augustin-de-Desmaures, Quebec, Canada